Clay City Junior-Senior High School is a middle school and high school located in Clay City, Indiana.

See also
 List of high schools in Indiana
 Southwestern Indiana Conference
 Clay City, Indiana

References

External links
Official Website

Public high schools in Indiana
Education in Clay County, Indiana
Buildings and structures in Clay County, Indiana